The Elementary Doctor Watson! is a studio album by the American country music artists Doc Watson and Merle Watson, released in 1972.

It peaked at #44 on the Billboard 200 chart.

History
The Elementary Doctor Watson! is Watson's first album after leaving the Vanguard Records label for Poppy Records (Poppy Records' founder Kevin Eggers later started Tomato Records and published many of the Poppy Records catalogue as CDs). It was the first of three successive Watson albums to be produced by Jack Clement. The next two won Grammy awards.

The cover art was created by one of Poppy Records' favoured artists, Milton Glaser, who also employed his font "Glaser Stencil" on the album's back cover.

Doc dedicated the song "Treasures Untold" to his wife Rosa Lee.

Sugar Hill records re-issued The Elementary Doctor Watson! on CD with four bonus tracks.

Reception

AllMusic's Jim Smith called the album "a great Sunday morning record, a genuine pleasure from start to finish."

Track listing
 "Going Down the Road Feeling Bad" (Traditional) – 2:48
 "The Last Thing on My Mind" (Tom Paxton) – 3:19
 "Freight Train Boogie" (Watson) – 3:00
 "More Pretty Girls Than One" (Alton Delmore, Smith) – 2:49
 "I Couldn't Believe It Was True" (Eddy Arnold, Wally Fowler) – 2:50
 "Summertime" (George Gershwin, Ira Gershwin, DuBose Heyward) – 3:25
 "Worried Blues" (Traditional) –  3:12
 "Interstate Rag" (Watson) – 2:28
 "Three Times Seven" (Cliff Stone, Merle Travis) – 2:18
 "Treasures Untold" (Ellsworth Cozzens, Jimmie Rodgers) – 3:07
Reissue bonus tracks:
 "I'm Going Fishing" (Traditional) – 2:38
 "Little Beggar Man/Old Joe Clark" (Traditional) – 2:08
 "Frankie and Johnny" (Traditional) – 3:05
 "Old Camp Meetin' Time" (Traditional) – 2:08

Personnel
Doc Watson – guitar, harmonica, vocals
Merle Watson – guitar, banjo
Norman Blake – dobro
Vassar Clements – fiddle
Joe Allen – bass
Kenny Malone – percussion
Charles Cochran – piano, string arrangements
Jim Colvard – guitar, baritone guitar
Jim Isbell – drums, sound effects
Ken Lauber – piano

Production notes
Produced by Jack Clement
Recorded at Jack Clement Recording Studios, Nashville, Tennessee
Engineered by Ronnie Dean and Lee Hazen
Cover art by Milton Glaser
David Glasser – re-issue digital re-mastering

References

External links
 Doc Watson discography

1972 albums
Doc Watson albums
Albums produced by Jack Clement
Tomato Records albums
Albums with cover art by Milton Glaser